The 2018 Eastern Washington Eagles football team represented Eastern Washington University in the 2018 NCAA Division I FCS football season. The team was coached by second year head coach Aaron Best. The Eagles played their home games at Roos Field in Cheney, Washington and were a member of the Big Sky Conference.  They finished the season 12–3, 7–1 in Big Sky play to finish in a three-way tie for the Big Sky championship with UC Davis and Weber State. They received an at-large bid to the FCS playoffs, where they defeated Nicholls, UC Davis, and Maine to advance to the National Championship Game, where they lost to North Dakota State.

Previous season
The Eagles finished the 2017 season 7–4, 6–2 in Big Sky play to finish in a three-way tie for third place. Despite being ranked in the top 25 at the end of the regular season, they were not selected to participate in the FCS Playoffs.

Preseason

Polls
On July 16, 2018 during the Big Sky Kickoff in Spokane, Washington, the Eagles were predicted to win the Big Sky by both the coaches and media.

Preseason All-Conference Team
The Eagles had three players selected to the Preseason All-Conference Team.

Gage Gubrud – Sr. QB

Antoine Custer – Jr. RB

Jay-Tee Tiuli – Sr. DT

Award watch lists

Schedule

Despite also being a member of the Big Sky, the game vs. Northern Arizona was counted as a non-conference game and had no effect on the Big Sky standings.

Game summaries

Central Washington

at Northern Arizona

at Washington State

Cal Poly

at Montana State

Southern Utah

at Weber State

Idaho

at Northern Colorado

UC Davis

at Portland State

FCS Playoffs

Nicholls–Second Round

UC Davis–Quarterfinals

Maine–Semifinals

North Dakota State–Championship

Ranking movements

References

Eastern Washington
Eastern Washington Eagles football seasons
Big Sky Conference football champion seasons
Eastern Washington
Eastern Washington Eagles football